Rabiul Hoque (born 1 January 1983) is a Bangladeshi-born international cricket umpire based in the United Arab Emirates. He was born in Chittagong, Bangladesh, and emigrated to the UAE in 2005. He stood in his first Twenty20 International (T20I) match between Ireland and the United Arab Emirates on 14 February 2016.

See also
 List of Twenty20 International cricket umpires

References

External links
 

1983 births
Living people
Bangladeshi cricket umpires
Bangladeshi emigrants to the United Arab Emirates
Bangladeshi expatriates in the United Arab Emirates
Emirati Twenty20 International cricket umpires
People from Chittagong